Malekabad (also Romanized as Malekābād; also known as Darreh-ye Shāshū) is a village in Jolgah Rural District, in the Central District of Jahrom County, Fars Province, Iran. At the 2006 census, its population was 17, in 7 families.

References 

Populated places in Jahrom County